The Legendary Zing Album is the second studio album by American soul-disco group, The Trammps, released in 1975 through Buddah Records.

Commercial performance
The album consists of tracks recorded in the early 1970s with the Philadelphia Soul sound. The album features the singles "Zing! Went the Strings of My Heart", which peaked at No. 17 on the Hot Soul Singles chart and No. 64 on the Billboard Hot 100, "Pray All You Sinners", which peaked at #34 on the Hot Soul Singles chart,  and "Hold Back the Night", which peaked at No. 10 on the Hot Soul Singles chart and No. 35 on the Billboard Hot 100.

Legacy 
The track "Rubber Band" was 30 years later sampled and used by rap artist the Game for his 2005 hit "Hate It Or Love It", and again the same year by Mary J. Blige on her song "MJB Da MVP". The song also appears in Grand Theft Auto V in the in-game radio station The Lowdown 91.1.

Track listing

Charts
Singles

References

External links

1975 albums
The Trammps albums
Albums produced by Norman Harris
Albums recorded at Sigma Sound Studios
Buddah Records albums